{{DISPLAYTITLE:C12H22O2}}
The molecular formula C12H22O2 (molar mass: 198.30 g/mol) may refer to:

 Menthyl acetate, a natural monoterpene which contributes to the smell and flavor of peppermint
 Vinyl neodecanoate, a vinylic monomer